Katrine Gislinge (born 1969) is a Danish pianist.

She began taking piano lessons at the age of six. After taking her diploma in 1990 at the Royal Danish Academy of Music in Copenhagen, she studied with, among others, Seymour Lipkin in New York City, Boris Berman at Yale, and Peter Feuchtwanger in London.

In recent years, Gislinge has embarked upon endeavours including chamber music collaborations with international musicians such as violinist Gidon Kremer, the German Petersen String Quartet, the cellist Jian Wang, cellist Marc Coppey, the flautist Emmanuel Pahud, the violinist Augustin Dumay and the violist Gérard Caussé, and solo concerts at international festivals, such as the Festival Internacional Cervantino in Mexico, Festival de Radio France et Montpellier and Lockenhaus Chamber Music Festival, soloist performances conducted by among others Eri Klas, Hiroyuki Iwaki, Michael Schønwandt, Okko Kamu, Heinrich Schiff, Kurt Sanderling, Ádám Fischer, Sylvain Cambreling and Gustavo Dudamel.

In 1999 Katrine Gislinge recorded the cd "piano works" on Deutsche Grammophon, being the first Danish pianist to record on this label. Katrine Gislinge is known for work in the classic repertoire, including all concertos by Mozart and Beethoven, but she is also a romantic pianist, playing the concerts by Schumann, Chopin and Tchaikovsky.

Katrine Gislinge has been a jury member at international piano competitions, - in 2006 and 2008 at the Tivoli International Piano Competition.

She has appeared on several TV shows and movies, e.g., the Danish TV-program Smagsdommerne.

Awards and recognitions
 Gold medal, Berlingske Tidende Music Competition,
 The Gade Prize,
 The Hafnia Prize (w. Trio Amando),
 The Simon Spies Honorary Award,
 Noilly Prat Prize,
 van Hauen's Music Award,
 Walther Schröders Piano Prize,
 Music Rewievers Society Award,
 Merete & Helge Finsen Honorary Award

Repertoire

Haydn
Concerto in D major

Mozart
All concertos

Beethoven
No. 1 in C major
No. 2 in B flat major
No. 4 in G major
No. 5 in E♭ major
Triple concerto in C major

Kuhlau
Concerto in C major

Weber
Konzertstück in F minor

Schumann
Concerto in A minor

Grieg
Concerto in A minor

Chopin
Concertos

Bartók
Concerto no. 3

Shostakovich
Concerto for piano, trumpet and strings

Tschaikowski
Concerto no. 1

Sergei Rachmaninoff
Rhapsody on a Theme of Paganini

Britten
Concerto for piano and strings

Manuel de Falla
Concerto for piano (cembalo), fl., ob., cl., vn. and vc.

Repertoire piano solo:

J. C. Bach
Sonatas

J. S. Bach
Toccata in C minor
Preludes/fuges
Concerto in Italian style

Haydn
All Sonatas

Mozart
All sonatas

Beethoven
Bagatelles Op. 33
Sonata no. 8 in C minor “Pathétique”
Sonata no. 14 Op. 27 no. 2 in C sharp minor “Moonlight”
Sonata no. 15  Op. 28 in D major “Pastorale”
Sonata no. 23 Op. 57 in F minor op. 57 “Appassionata”

Schubert
Sonata in A minor
Sonata nr. 23 in B flat major D960
4 Impromptus Op. 90 D899

Schumann
Kinderszenen Op. 15
Arabesque Op. 18
Kreisleriana Op. 16
Sonate no. 2 in G minor Op. 22
Carnaval Op. 9

Mendelssohn
Lieder ohne Worte

Chopin
Fantaisie in F minor Op. 49
Fantaisie-Impromptu Op. 66
Ballade in G minor
Ballade in A flat major
Ballade in F major
Scherzo in B minor
Scherzo in B flat minor
Polonaises
Mazurkas
Valses
Nocturnes
Etudes

Brahms
Klavierstücke Op. 119
2 Rhapsodies Op. 79

Mussorgsky
Pictures at an Exhibition

Grieg
Norwegian  Dances Op. 72
Ballade in G minor Op. 24

Debussy
Images Book I
L’Ile joyeuse

Janacêk
Sonate I.X.1905
“In the mist”

Manuel de Falla
Fantasía Baética

Bartók
Danses populaires roumaines

Erkki Melartin
Der traurige Garten

David Monrad Johansen
Nordlandsbilleder

Danish composers:
N. W. Gade (1817–1890)
Aquarelles

Carl Nielsen (1865–1931)
Three Piano Pieces Op. 59
Five Piano Pieces Op. 3
Chaconne

Tage Nielsen (born 1929)
Two Nocturnes

Per Nørgaard (born 1932)
“Turn”

Erik Nordby (born 1936)
'Passacaglia'

A Nordentoft (born 1956)
'Behind'

P.E. Lange-Müller
Dæmpede melodier

Thomas Blachman
Star Music Opus 1 

Christian Skeel
Klavermusik

External links
http://www.katrinegislinge.dk
Discography of Katrine Gislinge
http://www.tokafi.com/15questions/15-questions-katrine-gislinge/
Image
https://web.archive.org/web/20081014090917/http://www.altfordamerne.dk/kultur-oplevelser/ugens-artikler/klassisk-musik---virker-det-meget-nordet/
Music extracts

References

Danish classical pianists
Danish women pianists
1969 births
Living people
Royal Danish Academy of Music alumni
21st-century classical pianists
Women classical pianists
21st-century women pianists